The following is a timeline of the history of the city of Iași, Romania.

Before the 20th century

 1408 – Iași first mentioned in a document.
 1513 – Town "burned by the Tatars."
 1538 – Town sacked by Turks.
 1541 – Dancu Monastery founded.
 1562 – Socola Monastery built.
 1564 – Seat of Moldavian principality relocated to Iași from Suceava by Alexandru Lăpușneanu (approximate date).
 1628 – Bârnova Monastery built.
 1639 – Trei Ierarhi Monastery built.
 1640 – Vasilian College founded.
 1640s – Printing press in operation.
 1642 – Synod of Iași
 1660 – Golia Monastery built.
 1670 – Great Synagogue built.
 1686 – Town sacked by Russians.
 1710 – July: Forces muster near Iași at start of the Russo-Ottoman War of 1710–11.
 1707 – Princely Academy of Iași founded.
 1739 – City taken by Russians.
 1752 –  built.
 1755 –  established.
 1769 – City taken by Russians.
 1792 – 9 January: Treaty of Jassy signed in city, ending Russo-Turkish War (1787–92).
 1806 – Iași occupied by Russian forces.
 1813 – First engineering classes at the School of Surveying and Civil Engineers (part of the Princely Academy)
 1822 – City besieged by Turkish forces.
 1827 – Fire.
 1828 – City taken by Russians.
 1832 – The first theatre, the Théâtre des Variétés (Iași), is inaugurated. 
 1833
  founded.
 Roznovanu Palace built.
 1834
 Academia Mihăileană founded.
 Copou Park laid out.
 1844 – Fire.
 1846 – Iași National Theatre in the  opens.
 1855
  established.
 Yiddish-language Korot Haitim newspaper begins publication.
 1856 – Iași Botanical Garden established.
 1859 – City becomes seat of the Romanian United Principalities.
 1860
 University of Iași founded.
 Music and Declamation School and School for Sculpture and Painting founded.
 1861 – Seat of Romanian government relocated from Iași to Bucharest.
 1864 – Central State Library of Iași in operation.
 1870 – Iași railway station opens.
 1884 – Roman Catholic Diocese of Iași founded.
 1887 – Metropolitan Cathedral consecrated.
 1888 – 17 February:  burns down.
 1896 – Iași National Theatre building constructed.
 1900
 Electric  begin operating.
 Population: 78,067.

20th century

 1906 – Toynbee Hall Association founded.
 1916
 Capital of Kingdom of Romania relocated to Iași from Bucharest.
  established.
 1918 – Iași Conference
 1918 – Capital of Romania relocated from Iași back to Bucharest.
 1920 – Tătărași Athenaeum founded.
 1923 – Iași Exhibition Park opens.
 1925 – Palace of Justice built.
 1927 – Union Monument and Attacking Cavalryman Statue unveiled.
 1937 – Polytechnic Institute established.
 1941 – 27 June: Iași pogrom of Jews.
 1943 –  established.
 1944 – 21 August: City taken by Soviet forces.
 1946 -  (railway station) built.
 1948 - Population: 94,075.
 1949 – Puppet Theatre opens.
 1950 –  (railway station) built.
 1956 – Romanian National Opera debuts.
 1957 –  moves into the Palace of Culture.
 1960 – Stadionul Emil Alexandrescu (stadium) opens.
 1964 – Population: 123,558 city; 157,017 urban agglomeration.
 1970 – Moldova Mall in business.
 1977 – Population: 264,947 city; 284,308 urban agglomeration.
 1992 – Population: 344,425.
 1995 – Polirom publisher in business.
 2000 – Iulius Mall Iași in business.

21st century

 2002 – Population: 320,888.
 2010 – CSM Studențesc Iași football club formed.
 2011 – Population: 290,422.
 2012 – Palas Iași shopping mall in business.
 2014 – Iași-Ungheni, Moldova gas pipeline launched.

See also
 History of Iași
 
 Other names of Iași (e.g. Jashi, Jassy)

References

This article incorporates information from the Romanian Wikipedia and Russian Wikipedia.

Bibliography

External links

 Europeana. Items related to Iași, various dates.
 Digital Public Library of America. Items related to Iași, various dates

 
Iași
Years in Romania